Nadech Kugimiya (born December 17, 1991) is a Thai actor and model. He is best known for his roles in Duang Jai Akkanee (2010), Game Rai Game Rak (2011), Sunset at Chaophraya (2013), The Rising Sun Series (2014), Leh Lub Salub moRang (2017), The Crown Princess (2018) and The Con-Heartist (2020).

Early life and education
Nadech Kugimiya, birth name Chonlathit Yodprathum, was born on December 17, 1991 in Khon Kaen, Thailand. He is the adopted child of Sudarat Kugimiya (his biological aunt) and Yoshio Kugimiya. His biological mother is Thai and Sudarat's younger sister while his biological father is Austrian. His nickname "Barry" has evolved from his original nickname "Brand". He graduated from Rangsit University with a Bachelor's Degree in Communications, major in Film and Cinematography. He then graduated with a Master's Degree in May, 2020.

Career
Kugimiya started his modeling career at the age of 17. In 2010, he made his acting debut in a feature drama, starring in the lead role, in Ngao Rak Luang Jai as "Nawa Gamtornpuwanat". He gained immense popularity after he starred in Duang Jai Akkanee as "Fai Akkanee Adisuan" and in Game Rai Game Rak as "Saichon / Charles Makovich" alongside Urassaya Sperbund. He was also a member of the group "4+1 Channel 3 Superstar" with Mario Maurer, Prin Suparat, Pakorn Chatborirak, and Phupoom Pongpanu. He has an exclusive contract with Channel 3 (Thailand), with Suphachai Srivijit being his manager.

He is one of the highest paid actors in Thailand. Kugimiya is also a very in-demand brand endorser; he has been dubbed "King of Presenters." He has endorsed numerous major brands including Shopee, OPPO, 7-Eleven, AIR ASIA, Daikin, and TrueMove H. He is also one of the most visible celebrities in television, print, and billboard advertisements.

Kugimiya is considered one of the most decorated Thai actors. He has received more than 100 awards including the Best Actor award from the Suphannahong National Film Awards, Mekhala Awards, Nataraja Awards, and TV Gold Awards. Kugimiya frequently appears on the list of the most popular and influential people in Thailand.

Filmography

Film

Television series

Music video appearance

MC

Television
 ทุกวัน เวลา น. On Air

Online
 YouTube Channel: Nadech Kugimiya

Discography

Concerts

References

External links

 
 

1991 births
Living people
Nadech Kugimiya
Nadech Kugimiya
Nadech Kugimiya
Nadech Kugimiya
Nadech Kugimiya
Nadech Kugimiya
Nadech Kugimiya
Nadech Kugimiya